In Buddhism, the Seven Factors of Awakening (Pali: satta bojjhagā or satta sambojjhagā; Skt.: sapta bodhyanga) are:

 Mindfulness (sati, Sanskrit smṛti). To maintain awareness of reality, in particular the teachings (dhamma).
 Investigation of the nature of reality (dhamma vicaya, Skt. dharmapravicaya).
 Energy (viriya, Skt. vīrya) also determination, effort
 Joy or rapture (pīti, Skt. prīti)
 Relaxation or tranquility (passaddhi, Skt. prashrabdhi) of both body and mind
 Concentration (samādhi) a calm, one-pointed state of mind, or "bringing the buried latencies or samskaras into full view"
 Equanimity (upekkha, Skt. upekshā). To accept reality as-it-is (yathā-bhuta) without craving or aversion.

This evaluation of seven awakening factors is one of the "Seven Sets" of "Awakening-related states" (bodhipakkhiyadhamma).

The Pali word bojjhanga is a compound of bodhi ("awakening," "enlightenment") and anga ("factor").

Etymology
Satta sambojjhagā:
 satta – seven;
 bodh – an abstract noun formed from the verbal root *budh- (to awake, become aware, notice, know or understand) corresponding to the verbs bujjhati (Pāli) and bodhati or budhyate (Sanskrit);
 aṅga – a part of a whole; factor, cause.

Pali literature
In the Sutta Pitaka's Samyutta Nikaya, the bojjhangas refer to wholesome, mundane factors leading to enlightenment.  In the Abhidhamma and Pali commentaries, the bojjhangas tend to refer to supramundane factors concurrent with enlightenment.

Sutta Pitaka
According to one discourse in the Samyutta Nikaya entitled "Bhikkhu Sutta" (SN 46.5):
[Bhikkhu:] "Venerable sir, it is said, 'factors of enlightenment, factors of enlightenment.' In what sense are they called factors of enlightenment?"
[Buddha:] "They lead to enlightenment, bhikkhu, therefore they are called factors of enlightenment...."

During meditation, one may contemplate the seven Factors of Enlightenment as well as on their antithesis, the Five Hindrances (sensual pleasure, ill-will, sloth-torpor, restlessness-worry, doubt).  In addition, one Samyutta Nikaya sutta identifies developing each of the enlightenment factors accompanied by each of the four brahma viharas (lovingkindness, compassion, sympathetic joy, equanimity).

In the Samyutta Nikaya's "Fire Discourse," the Buddha identifies that mindfulness is "always useful" (sabbatthika); while, when one's mind is sluggish, one should develop the enlightenment factors of investigation, energy and joy; and, when one's mind is excited, one should develop the enlightenment factors of tranquility, concentration and equanimity.

Again according to the Samyutta Nikaya, once when the Buddha was gravely ill he asked Venerable Mahacunda to recite the seven Factors of Enlightenment to him. In such a way the Buddha was cured of his illness.

Abhidhamma and commentarial literature
In the Visuddhimagga, in a section discussing skills needed for the attainment and maintenance of absorption (jhana), Buddhaghosa identifies the bojjhangas in the following fashion:
 "Strong mindfulness ... is needed in all instances...."
 "When his mind is slack with over-laxness of energy, etc., then ... he should develop those [three enlightenment factors] beginning with investigation-of-states..." (i.e., dhamma vicaya, viriya, piti).
 "When his mind is agitated through over-energeticness, etc., then ... he should develop those [three enlightenment factors] beginning with tranquility..." (i.e., passaddhi, samadhi, upekkha).

Meditation

The seven factors of awakening are closely related to the practice of dhyana, resembling the various factors that are part of the four dhyanas.

In meditation everyone most likely experiences two of the five hindrances (Pāli: pañca nīvaraṇāni). They are sloth and torpor (Pāli: thīna-middha), which is half-hearted action with little or no collectedness, and restlessness and worry (uddhacca-kukkucca), which is the inability to calm the mind.

As indicated above, in the "Fire Discourse" (SN 46.53), it is recommended that joy or rapture, investigation, and energy are to be developed when experiencing sloth and torpor. Relaxation, concentration, and equanimity are to be developed when experiencing restlessness or worry. Mindfulness should be constantly present to remain aware of physical change as well as mental change in either skillful or unskillful direction.

See also 
 Five hindrances
 Five Strengths
 Iddhipāda
 Reality in Buddhism
 Thirty-seven factors of Enlightenment
 Pāramitā

Notes

Sources 

 Bodhi, Bhikkhu (trans.) (2000). The Connected Discourses of the Buddha: A Translation of the Samyutta Nikaya. Boston: Wisdom Pubs. .
 Buddhaghosa, Bhadantacariya & Bhikkhu  (trans.) (1999). The Path of Purification: Visuddhimagga. Seattle, WA: BPS Pariyatti Editions. .
 
 Piyadassi Thera, Venerable (trans.) (1999). Gilana Sutta: Ill (Factors of Enlightenment) (SN 46.16).  Retrieved 10 Jul 2007 from "Access to Insight" at http://www.accesstoinsight.org/tipitaka/sn/sn46/sn46.016.piya.html.
 Piyadassi Thera, Venerable (trans.) (n.d.). The Book of Protection: Factors of Enlightenment (3), Maha Cunda Thera Bojjhanga.  Retrieved from "BuddhaNet.net" at http://www.buddhanet.net/e-learning/buddhism/bp_sut14.htm.
 Rhys Davids, T.W. & William Stede (eds.) (1921–5). The Pali Text Society's Pali–English Dictionary. Chipstead: Pali Text Society. A general on-line search engine for this dictionary is available at http://dsal.uchicago.edu/dictionaries/pali/.
 Walshe, Maurice O'C. (1985). Samyutta Nikaya: An Anthology (Part III) (Wheel No. 318-321). Kandy: Buddhist Publication Society.  Retrieved 2008-11-09 from "Access to Insight" (2007, 2009) at http://www.accesstoinsight.org/lib/authors/walshe/wheel318.html and, for an excerpted version of the "Fire Discourse" (SN 46.53), at http://www.accesstoinsight.org/tipitaka/sn/sn46/sn46.053.wlsh.html .

External links 
 Thanissaro Bhikkhu (trans.) (1997). Himavanta Sutta: The Himalayas (On the Factors for Awakening) (SN 46.1). Retrieved from "Access to Insight" at http://www.accesstoinsight.org/canon/sutta/samyutta/sn46-001.html.
 Seven Factors of Enlightenment by Ven Vimalaramsi
 The Seven Factors of Enlightenment by Piyadassi Thera
 The Seven Factors of Enlightenment by Ven Ariyadhamma

Buddhist philosophical concepts